Psychos is a six-part British television drama series, first broadcast on 6 May 1999, that aired on Channel 4. The series focuses upon a manic-depressive psychiatrist, Dr. Daniel Nash, and the hospital in Glasgow where he works. The series was written by David Wolstencroft and directed by John McKay and Andy Wilson. Douglas Henshall starred as Dr. Daniel Nash, with Neve McIntosh, Alastair Mackenzie and Indira Varma also appearing in lead roles. The series was nominated for the BAFTA Television Award for Best Drama Series, and its writer, Wolstencroft, won the RTS best newcomer award for off-screen talent.

The series was strongly criticised by Ofcom which upheld 28 complaints made by viewers, and stated that, following an investigation, the series "reinforced stereotypes and prejudice towards people involved in mental health". Ofcom also ruled that "a sexual relationship between a doctor and a patient was trivialised and gave the wrong signal about the seriousness of such a breach of trust". In light of the investigation, a planned second series was cancelled and the series was not released on home video. The complete series has since been available to view on All4, but was not released on DVD.

Cast
 Douglas Henshall as Dr. Daniel Nash 
 Neve McIntosh as Dr. Kate Millar 
 Alastair Mackenzie as Dr. 'Shug' Nevin 
 Alison Peebles as Anne Cowan 
 Iain Fraser as Jim Reid 
 Indira Varma as Dr. Martine Nichol 
 Jenny McCrindle as Sue Hamilton 
 Elaine Collins as Laura Robb 
 Nicholas Clay as Dr. Angus Harvey
 Clare Cathcart as Shona Temple 
 Naoko Mori as Mariko Harris 
 Lynsey Baxter as Dr. Karen Smith

Episodes

References

External links
 
Psychos at Channel4.com

1999 British television series debuts
1999 British television series endings
1990s British drama television series
English-language television shows
Channel 4 original programming
1990s British medical television series